Christopher Jon Seddon (born October 13, 1983) is an American former professional baseball pitcher. Seddon was drafted by the Tampa Bay Devil Rays in the fifth round of the 2001 Major League Baseball draft. He later went on to play in the Devil Rays organization (2001–2007), the Florida Marlins organization (2007–2008), the Seattle Mariners organization (2009–2010) and the Cleveland Indians organization (2012). On September 3, 2007, Seddon made his Major League Baseball (MLB) debut with the Marlins. He has also played in Korea Baseball Organization (KBO) for the SK Wyverns and in Nippon Professional Baseball (NPB) for the Yomiuri Giants.

Professional career

Tampa Bay Devil Rays
Seddon was drafted in the fifth round of the 2001 Major League Baseball draft by the Tampa Bay Devil Rays out of Canyon High School in Santa Clarita, California.

Florida Marlins
He was called up by the Florida Marlins and made his major league debut on September 3, . He spent all of  playing for the Albuquerque Isotopes, the Marlins' Triple-A team and became a free agent at the end of the season.

Seattle Mariners
In December , he signed a minor league contract with the Seattle Mariners. He was granted Free Agency after the  season but decided to re-sign to minor league contract with the Mariners.  On July 15, 2010, Seddon was called up by the Mariners. He made his debut for the Mariners 2 days later.

Following the 2010 season, he accepted an invitation to Mariners' spring training.

Cleveland Indians
On January 9, 2012, Seddon signed a minor league contract with the Cleveland Indians. He also received an invitation to spring training.

Seddon's contract was purchased by the Indians on August 5, 2012. He was designated for assignment on November 30, 2012, to make room for Mike McDade.

SK Wyverns
On December 6, 2012, Seddon had his contract sold to the SK Wyverns in South Korea.

Yomiuri Giants
He signed with the Yomiuri Giants of the Nippon Professional Baseball League for the 2014 season.

Lamigo Monkeys
On April 13, 2015, he signed with the Lamigo Monkeys of the Chinese Professional Baseball League in Taiwan.

Second Stint with Wyverns
Seddon signed with the SK Wyverns for the 2015 season.

Fubon Guardians
Seddon signed with the Fubon Guardians of the Chinese Professional Baseball League for the 2017 season. On June 23, 2017, Seddon was released by the Guardians after struggling to a 5.92 ERA in 65.1 innings pitched.

References

External links 

Career statistics and player information from Korea Baseball Organization

1983 births
Living people
People from Northridge, Los Angeles
American expatriate baseball players in Japan
American expatriate baseball players in Taiwan
American expatriate baseball players in South Korea
Florida Marlins players
Seattle Mariners players
Cleveland Indians players
Baseball players from California
Major League Baseball pitchers
Princeton Devil Rays players
Charleston RiverDogs players
Bakersfield Blaze players
Montgomery Biscuits players
Durham Bulls players
Carolina Mudcats players
Albuquerque Isotopes players
Tacoma Rainiers players
Columbus Clippers players
SSG Landers players
KBO League pitchers
Yomiuri Giants players
Nippon Professional Baseball pitchers
Lamigo Monkeys players
Fubon Guardians players